Our Mutual Friend is a 1958 British television mini-series adapted from Charles Dickens' 1865 novel Our Mutual Friend. The series was made by the BBC and ran through 1959 for a total of twelve episodes, broadcast live and telerecorded for potential repeats. Unlike most BBC series of the 1950s, the series exists in its entirety, and in 2017 was released to DVD by Simply Media.

Cast and characters

References

External links
 

1950s British drama television series
1958 British television series debuts
Television shows based on works by Charles Dickens
1959 British television series endings
Black-and-white British television shows
English-language television shows
1950s British television miniseries
Our Mutual Friend